DXOM is the callsign of Notre Dame Broadcasting Corporation's two stations in Koronadal: 

 DXOM-AM, branded as Radyo Bida
 DXOM-FM, branded as Happy FM